Twin Husbands may refer to:

Twin Husbands (1921 film)
Twin Husbands (1922 film)
Twin Husbands (1933 film)
Twin Husbands (1946 film)